Lower Police Reserve Hill Ward also known as Lower P. R. Hill is a ward located under Nagaland's capital city, Kohima. The ward falls under the designated Ward No. 19 of the Kohima Municipal Council.

Education
Educational Institutions in Lower Police Reserve Hill Ward:

Schools 
 Lower P.R. Hill Government Primary School
 St. Peter's School

See also
 Municipal Wards of Kohima

References

External links
 Map of Kohima Ward No. 19

Kohima
Wards of Kohima